Jimmy J. Moreton (22 September 1891 – August 1942) was a football player and manager. He joined Tranmere Rovers from Cammell Laird in July 1910. He was switched from right-half to outside right, where he set up countless goals for a succession of Tranmere centre forwards, including Dixie Dean, in almost 500 appearances at the club.

Upon retirement, aged 37, Moreton became trainer alongside manager Bert Cooke, before taking over as manager himself, from 1939, during World War II. He died in 1942, and was succeeded by another former player, Bill Ridding.

References

Tranmere Rovers F.C. managers
Tranmere Rovers F.C. players
1942 deaths
1891 births
Cammell Laird 1907 F.C. players
Association football wing halves
Association football wingers
English footballers